Hellebæk station is a railway station serving the town of Hellebæk about 5 kilometres north of the city of Helsingør, Denmark.

The station is located on the Hornbæk Line from Helsingør to Gilleleje. The train services are currently operated by the railway company Lokaltog which runs frequent local train services between Helsingør station and Gilleleje station.

See also
 List of railway stations in Denmark

External links

Lokaltog

Railway stations in the Capital Region of Denmark
Buildings and structures in Helsingør Municipality
Railway stations opened in 1906
Railway stations in Denmark opened in the 20th century